The men's pole vault event  at the 1987 IAAF World Indoor Championships was held at the Hoosier Dome in Indianapolis on 8 March.

Results

References

Pole
Pole vault at the World Athletics Indoor Championships